Singular they, along with its inflected or derivative forms, them, their, theirs and themselves (also themself, and theirself), is a gender-neutral third-person pronoun. It typically occurs with an unspecified antecedent, in sentences such as:

"Somebody left their umbrella in the office. Could you please let them know where they can get it?"
"My personal rule is to never trust anyone who says that they had a good time in high school."
"The patient should be told at the outset how much they will be required to pay."
"But a journalist should not be forced to reveal their sources."

This use of singular they had emerged by the 14th century, about a century after the plural they. It has been commonly employed in everyday English ever since and has gained currency in official contexts. Singular they has been criticised since the mid-18th century by prescriptive commentators who consider it an error. Its continued use in modern standard English has become more common and formally accepted with the move toward gender-neutral language. Though some early-21st-century style guides described it as colloquial and less appropriate in formal writing, by 2020 most style guides accepted the singular they as a personal pronoun.

In the early 21st century, use of singular they with known individuals emerged for people who do not identify as male or female, as in, for example, "This is my friend, Jay. I met them at work." They in this context was named Word of the Year for 2015 by the American Dialect Society, and for 2019 by Merriam-Webster. In 2020, the American Dialect Society also selected it as Word of the Decade for the 2010s.

Inflected forms and derivative pronouns
Like the "singular you", "singular they" permits a singular antecedent, but is used with the same verb forms as plural they, and has the same inflected forms as plural they (i.e. them, their, and theirs), except that in the reflexive form, themself is sometimes used instead of themselves.

Themself is attested from the 14th to 16th centuries. Its use has been increasing since the 1970s or 1980s, though it is sometimes still classified as "a minority form". In 2002, Payne and Huddleston, in The Cambridge Grammar of the English Language, called its use in standard dialect "rare and acceptable only to a minority of speakers" but "likely to increase with the growing acceptance of they as a singular pronoun". It is useful when referring to a single person of indeterminate gender, where the plural form themselves might seem incongruous, as in:

"It is not an actor pretending to be Reagan or Thatcher, it is, in grotesque form, the person themself." — Ian Hislop (1984); quoted in Fowler's

Regional preferences
The Canadian government recommends themselves as the reflexive form of singular they for use in Canadian federal legislative texts and advises against using themself.

Usage

They with a singular antecedent goes back to the Middle English of the 14th century (slightly younger than they with a plural antecedent, which was borrowed from Old Norse in the 13th century), and has remained in use for centuries in spite of its proscription by traditional grammarians beginning in the mid 18th century.

Informal spoken English exhibits universal use of the singular they. An examination by Jürgen Gerner of the British National Corpus published in 1998 found that British speakers, regardless of social status, age, sex, or region, used the singular they more often than the gender-neutral he or other options.

Prescription of generic he
Alongside they, it has historically been acceptable to use the pronoun he to refer to an indefinite person of any gender, as in the following:

"If any one did not know it, it was his own fault." — George Washington Cable, Old Creole Days (1879); quoted by Baskervill & Sewell.
"Every person who turns this page has his own little diary." — W. M. Thackeray, On Lett's Diary (1869); quoted in Baskervill & Sewell, An English Grammar.

The earliest known explicit recommendation by a grammarian to use the generic he rather than they in formal English is Ann Fisher's mid-18th century A New Grammar assertion that "The Masculine Person answers to the general Name, which comprehends both Male and Female; as, any Person who knows what he says." (Ann Fisher as quoted by Ostade)

Nineteenth-century grammarians insisted on he as a gender-neutral pronoun on the grounds of number agreement, while rejecting "he or she" as clumsy, and this was widely adopted: e.g. in 1850, the British Parliament passed an act which provided that, when used in acts of Parliament "words importing the masculine gender shall be deemed and taken to include females". Baskervill and Sewell mention the common use of the singular they in their An English Grammar for the Use of High School, Academy and College Class of 1895, but prefer the generic he on the basis of number agreement.

Baskervill gives a number of examples of recognized authors using the singular they, including:

"Every one must judge according to their own feelings." — Lord Byron, Werner (1823), quoted as "Every one must judge of [sic] their own feelings."
"Had the Doctor been contented to take my dining tables as any body in their senses would have done ..." — Jane Austen, Mansfield Park (1814);

It has been argued that the real motivation for promoting the "generic" he was an androcentric world view, with the default sex of humans being male – and the default gender therefore being masculine. There is some evidence for this: Wilson wrote in 1560:

"... let us keepe a naturall order, and set the man before the woman for manners sake". — Wilson, The arte of Rhetorique (1560);
"... the worthier is preferred and set before. As a man is set before a woman ..." — Wilson, The arte of Rhetorique (1560);
And Poole wrote in 1646:
"The Masculine gender is more worthy than the Feminine." — Poole, The English Accidence (1646); cited by Bodine

In spite of continuous attempts on the part of educationalists to proscribe singular they in favour of he, this advice was ignored; even writers of the period continued to use they (though the proscription may have been observed more by American writers). Use of the purportedly gender-neutral he remained acceptable until at least the 1960s, though some uses of he were later criticized as being awkward or silly, for instance when referring to:
 Indeterminate persons of both sexes:
"The ideal that every boy and girl should be so equipped that he shall not be handicapped in his struggle for social progress ..." — C. C. Fries, American English Grammar, (1940).
 Known persons of both sexes:
"She and Louis had a game – who could find the ugliest photograph of himself." — Joseph P. Lash, Eleanor and Franklin (1971)

Contemporary use of he to refer to a generic or indefinite antecedent

He is still sometimes found in contemporary writing when referring to a generic or indeterminate antecedent. In some cases it is clear from the situation that the persons potentially referred to are likely to be male, as in:

"The patient should be informed of his therapeutic options." — a text about prostate cancer (2004)
In some cases the antecedent may refer to persons who are only probably male or to occupations traditionally thought of as male:
"It wouldn't be as if the lone astronaut would be completely by himself." (2008)
"Kitchen table issues ... are ones the next president can actually do something about if he actually cares about it. More likely if she cares about it!" — Hillary Rodham Clinton (2008)
In other situations, the antecedent may refer to an indeterminate person of either sex:
"Now, a writer is entitled to have a Roget on his desk." — Barzun (1985); quoted in Merriam-Webster's Concise Dictionary of English Usage
"A Member of Parliament should always live in his constituency."
In 2010, Choy and Clark still recommend the use of generic he "in formal speech or writing":

"... when indefinite pronouns are used as antecedents, they require singular subject, object, and possessive pronouns ..."

"Everyone did as he pleased"

In informal spoken English, plural pronouns are often used with indefinite pronoun antecedents. However, this construction is generally not considered appropriate in formal speech or writing.

Informal: Somebody should let you borrow their book.

Formal: Somebody should let you borrow his book."

—Choy, Basic Grammar and Usage

In 2015, Fowler's Dictionary of Modern English Usage calls this "the now outmoded use of he to mean 'anyone, stating:

In 2016, Garner's Modern English calls the generic use of masculine pronouns "the traditional view, now widely assailed as sexist".

The rise of gender-neutral language
The earliest known attempt to create gender-neutral pronouns dates back to 1792, when Scottish economist James Anderson advocated for an indeterminate pronoun "ou".

In 1808, poet Samuel Taylor Coleridge suggested "it" and "which" as neutral pronouns for the word "Person":

In the second half of the 20th century, people expressed more widespread concern at the use of male-oriented language. This included criticism of the use of man as a generic term to include men and women and of the use of he to refer to any human, regardless of sex (social gender).

It was argued that he could not sensibly be used as a generic pronoun understood to include men and women. William Safire in his On Language column in The New York Times approved of the use of generic he, mentioning the mnemonic phrase "the male embraces the female". C. Badendyck from Brooklyn wrote to the New York Times in a reply:

By 1980, the movement toward gender-neutral language had gained wide support, and many organizations, including most publishers, had issued guidelines on the use of gender-neutral language, but stopped short of recommending they to be third-person singular with a non-indeterminate, singular antecedent.

Contemporary usage
The use of masculine generic nouns and pronouns in written and spoken language has decreased since the 1970s.
In a corpus of spontaneous speech collected in Australia in the 1990s, singular they had become the most frequently used generic pronoun (rather than generic he or he or she). Similarly, a study from 2002 looking at a corpus of American and British newspapers showed a preference for they to be used as a singular epicene pronoun.

The increased use of singular they may owe in part to an increasing desire for gender-neutral language. A solution in formal writing has often been to write "he or she", or something similar, but this is often considered awkward or overly politically correct, particularly when used excessively. In 2016, the journal American Speech published a study by Darren K. LaScotte investigating the pronouns used by native English speakers in informal written responses to questions concerning a subject of unspecified gender, finding that 68% of study participants chose singular they to refer to such an antecedent. Some participants noted that they found constructions such as "he or she" inadequate as they do not include people who identify as neither male nor female.

They in this context was named Word of the Year for 2019 by Merriam-Webster and for 2015 by the American Dialect Society. On January 4, 2020, the American Dialect Society announced they had crowned they, again in this context, Word of the Decade for the 2010s.

Use with a pronoun antecedent
The singular antecedent can be a pronoun such as someone, anybody, or everybody, or an interrogative pronoun such as who:
 With somebody or someone:
"I feel that if someone is not doing their job it should be called to their attention." —an American newspaper (1984); quoted by Fowler.
 With anybody or anyone:
"If anyone tells you that America's best days are behind her, then theyre looking the wrong way." President George Bush, 1991 State of the Union Address; quoted by Garner
"Anyone can set themselves up as an acupuncturist." —Sarah Lonsdale "Sharp Practice Pricks Reputation of Acupuncture". Observer 15 December 1991, as cited by Garner
"If anybody calls, take their name and ask them to call again later." Example given by Swan

"It will be illegal for anyone to donate an organ to their wife, husband, adopted child, adopted parent or close friend." 
 With nobody or no one:
"No one put their hand up." Example given by Huddleston et al.
"No one felt they had been misled." Example given by Huddleston et al.
 With an interrogative pronoun as antecedent:
"Who thinks they can solve the problem?". Example given by Huddleston et al.; The Cambridge Grammar of the English language.
 With everybody, everyone, etc.:
"Everyone promised to behave themselves." Example given by Huddleston et al.

Notional plurality or pairwise relationships
Although the pronouns everybody, everyone, nobody, and no one are singular in form and are used with a singular verb, these pronouns have an "implied plurality" that is somewhat similar to the implied plurality of collective or group nouns such as crowd or team, and in some sentences where the antecedent is one of these "implied plural" pronouns, the word they cannot be replaced by generic he, suggesting a "notional plural" rather than a "bound variable" interpretation . This is in contrast to sentences that involve multiple pairwise relationships and singular they, such as:
"Everyone loves their mother."
I never did get into that football thing', she said after everyone returned to their seat."
"Everyone doubts themselves/themself at one time or another."

There are examples where the antecedent pronoun (such as everyone) may refer to a collective, with no necessary implication of pairwise relationships. These are examples of plural they:
"At first everyone in the room was singing; then they began to laugh." Example given by Kolln.
"Everybody was crouched behind the furniture to surprise me, and they tried to. But I already knew they were there." Example given by Garner.
"Nobody was late, were they?" Example given by Swan.
Which are apparent because they do not work with a generic he or he or she:
"At first everyone in the room was singing; then he or she began to laugh." Example given by Kolln.
"Everybody was crouched behind the furniture to surprise me, and he tried to. But I already knew he was there."
"Nobody was late, was he?"
In addition, for these "notional plural" cases, it would not be appropriate to use themself instead of themselves as in:
"Everybody was crouched behind the furniture to surprise me, but they instead surprised themself."

Use with a generic noun as antecedent
The singular antecedent can also be a noun such as person, patient, or student:
 With a noun (e.g. person, student, patient) used generically (e.g. in the sense of any member of that class or a specific member unknown to the speaker or writer)
"cognitive dissonance: "a concept in psychology [that] describes the condition in which a person's attitudes conflict with their behaviour". — Macmillan Dictionary of Business and Management (1988), as cited by Garner.
"A starting point would be to give more support to the company secretary. They are, or should be, privy to the confidential deliberations and secrets of the board and the company. —Ronald Severn. "Protecting the Secretary Bird". Financial Times, 6 January 1992; quoted by Garner.
 With representatives of a class previously referred to in the singular
"I had to decide: Is this person being irrational or is he right? Of course, they were often right." — Robert Burchfield in U.S. News & World Report 11 August 1986, as cited in Merriam-Webster's Concise Dictionary of English Usage
Even when referring to a class of persons of known sex, they is sometimes used:
"I swear more when I'm talking to a boy, because I'm not afraid of shocking them". From an interview.
"No mother should be forced to testify against their child".
They may also be used with antecedents of mixed genders:
"Let me know if your father or your mother changes their mind." Example given by Huddleston et al.
"Either the husband or the wife has perjured themself." Here themself might be acceptable to some, themselves seems less acceptable, and himself is unacceptable. Example given by Huddleston et al.
Even for a definite known person of known sex, they may be used in order to ignore or conceal the sex.
"I had a friend in Paris, and they had to go to hospital for a month." (definite person, not identified)
The word themself is also sometimes used when the antecedent is known or believed to be a single person:
"Someone has apparently locked themself in the office."[acceptability questionable]

Use for specific, known people, including non-binary people
Known individuals may be referred to as they if the individual's gender is unknown to the speaker.

A known individual may also be referred to as they if the individual is non-binary or genderqueer and considers they and derivatives as appropriate pronouns. Several social media applications permit account holders to choose to identify their gender using one of a variety of non-binary or genderqueer options, such as genderfluid, agender, or bigender, and to designate pronouns, including they/them, which they wish to be used when referring to them. Explicitly designating one's pronouns as they/them increases the chance that people will interpret "they" as singular. Though "singular they" has long been used with antecedents such as everybody or generic persons of unknown gender, this use, which may be chosen by an individual, is recent. The earliest recorded usage of this sense documented by the Oxford English Dictionary is in a tweet from 2009; the journal American Speech documents an example from 2008 in an article in the journal Women's Studies Quarterly. As of 2020, singular they is the most popular pronoun set used by non-binary people. Approximately 80% consider it appropriate for themselves.

The singular they in the meaning "gender-neutral singular pronoun for a known person, as a non-binary identifier" was chosen by the American Dialect Society as their "Word of the Year" for 2015. In 2016, the American Dialect Society wrote:

The vote followed the previous year's approval of this use by The Washington Post style guide, when Bill Walsh, the Posts copy editor, said that the singular they is "the only sensible solution to English's lack of a gender-neutral third-person singular personal pronoun".

In 2019, the non-binary they was added to Merriam-Webster's dictionary.

The first non-binary main character on North American television appeared on the Showtime drama series Billions in 2017, with Asia Kate Dillon playing Taylor Mason. Both actor and character use singular they.

Acceptability and prescriptive guidance

Though both generic he and generic they have long histories of use, and both are still used, both are also systematically avoided by particular groups.

Style guides that avoid expressing a preference for either approach sometimes recommend recasting a problem sentence, for instance replacing generic expressions with plurals to avoid the criticisms of either party.

The use of singular they may be more accepted in British English than in American English, or vice versa.

Usage guidance in American style guides

Garner's Modern American Usage
Garner's Modern American Usage (2nd ed., 2003) recommends cautious use of singular they, and avoidance where possible because its use is stigmatized.
"Where noun–pronoun disagreement can be avoided, avoid it. Where it can't be avoided, resort to it cautiously because some people will doubt your literacy ..."
Garner suggests that use of singular they is more acceptable in British English:
and apparently regrets the resistance by the American language community:
"That it sets many literate Americans' teeth on edge is an unfortunate obstacle to what promises to be the ultimate solution to the problem."
He regards the trend toward using singular they with antecedents like everybody, anyone and somebody as inevitable:
"Disturbing though these developments may be to purists, they're irreversible. And nothing that a grammarian says will change them."

The Chicago Manual of Style
In the 14th edition (1993) of The Chicago Manual of Style, the University of Chicago Press explicitly recommended using singular they and their, noting a "revival" of this usage and citing "its venerable use by such writers as Addison, Austen, Chesterfield, Fielding, Ruskin, Scott, and Shakespeare."
From the 15th edition (2003), this was changed. In Chapter 5 of the 17th edition (2017), now written by Bryan A. Garner, the recommendations are:

The American Heritage Book of English Usage (1996)
According to The American Heritage Book of English Usage and its usage panel of selected writers, journalism professors, linguists, and other experts, many Americans avoid use of they to refer to a singular antecedent out of respect for a "traditional" grammatical rule, despite use of singular they by modern writers of note and mainstream publications:

Publication Manual of the American Psychological Association
The 7th edition of the American Psychological Association's Publication Manual, released in October 2019, advises using singular "they" when gender is unknown or irrelevant, and gives the following example:

APA style also endorses using they/them if it is someone's (for example, a non-binary person's) preferred pronoun set.

Strunk & White's The Elements of Style
William Strunk Jr. & E. B. White, the original authors of The Elements of Style, found use of they with a singular antecedent unacceptable and advised use of the singular pronoun (he). In the 3rd edition (1979), the recommendation was still:

The assessment, in 1979, was:

In the 4th edition (2000), use of singular they was still proscribed against, but use of generic he was no longer recommended.

Joseph M. Williams's The Basics of Clarity and Grace (2009)
Joseph M. Williams, who wrote a number of books on writing with "clarity and grace", discusses the advantages and disadvantages of various solutions when faced with the problem of referring to an antecedent such as someone, everyone, no one or a noun that does not indicate gender and suggests that this will continue to be a problem for some time. He "suspect[s] that eventually we will accept the plural they as a correct singular" but states that currently "formal usage requires a singular pronoun".

The Little, Brown Handbook (1992)
According to The Little, Brown Handbook, most experts – and some teachers and employers – find use of singular they unacceptable:

It recommends using he or she or avoiding the problem by rewriting the sentence to use a plural or omit the pronoun.

Purdue Online Writing Lab
The Purdue Online Writing Lab (OWL) states that "grammar shifts and changes over time", that the use of singular they is acceptable, and that singular "they" as a replacement for "he" or "she" is more inclusive:

The Washington Post
The Washington Posts stylebook, as of 2015, recommends trying to "write around the problem, perhaps by changing singulars to plurals, before using the singular they as a last resort" and specifically permits use of they for a "gender-nonconforming person".

Associated Press Stylebook
The Associated Press Stylebook, as of 2017, recommends: "They/them/their is acceptable in limited cases as a singular and-or gender-neutral pronoun, when alternative wording is overly awkward or clumsy. However, rewording usually is possible and always is preferable."

The Handbook of Nonsexist Writing
In The Handbook of Nonsexist Writing, Casey Miller and Kate Swift accept or recommend singular uses of they in cases where there is an element of semantic plurality expressed by a word such as "everyone" or where an indeterminate person is referred to, citing examples of such usage in formal speech. They also suggest rewriting sentences to use a plural they, eliminating pronouns, or recasting sentences to use "one" or (for babies) "it".

Usage guidance in British style guides

In the first edition of A Dictionary of Modern English Usage (published in 1926) use of the generic he is recommended. It is stated that singular they is disapproved of by grammarians. Numerous examples of its use by eminent writers in the past are given, but it is stated that "few good modern writers would flout [grammarians] so conspicuously as Fielding and Thackeray", whose sentences are described as having an "old-fashioned sound".

The second edition, Fowler's Modern English Usage (edited by Sir Ernest Gowers and published in 1965) continues to recommend use of the generic he; use of the singular they is called "the popular solution", which "sets the literary man's teeth on edge". It is stated that singular they is still disapproved of by grammarians but common in colloquial speech.

According to the third edition, The New Fowler's Modern English Usage (edited by Robert Burchfield and published in 1996) singular they has not only been widely used by good writers for centuries, but is now generally accepted, except by some conservative grammarians, including the Fowler of 1926, who, it is argued, ignored the evidence:

The Complete Plain Words was originally written in 1948 by Ernest Gowers, a civil servant, in an attempt by the British civil service to improve "official English". A second edition, edited by Sir Bruce Fraser, was published in 1973. It refers to they or them as the "equivalent of a singular pronoun of common sex" as "common in speech and not unknown in serious writing " but "stigmatized by grammarians as usage grammatically indefensible. The book's advice for "official writers" (civil servants) is to avoid its use and not to be tempted by its "greater convenience", though "necessity may eventually force it into the category of accepted idiom".

A new edition of Plain Words, revised and updated by Gowers's great-granddaughter, Rebecca Gowers, was published in 2014.
It notes that singular they and them have become much more widespread since Gowers' original comments, but still finds it "safer" to treat a sentence like 'The reader may toss their book aside' as incorrect "in formal English", while rejecting even more strongly sentences like
"There must be opportunity for the individual boy or girl to go as far as his keenness and ability will take him."

The Times Style and Usage Guide (first published in 2003 by The Times of London) recommends avoiding sentences like
"If someone loves animals, they should protect them."
by using a plural construction:
"If people love animals, they should protect them."

The Cambridge Guide to English Usage (2004, Cambridge University Press) finds singular they "unremarkable":

It expresses several preferences.
 "Generic/universal their provides a gender-free pronoun, avoiding the exclusive his and the clumsy his/her. It avoids gratuitous sexism and gives the statement broadest reference ... They, them, their are now freely used in agreement with singular indefinite pronouns and determiners, those with universal implications such as any(one), every(one), no(one), as well as each and some(one), whose reference is often more individual ..."

The Economist Style Guide refers to the use of they in sentences like
"We can't afford to squander anyone's talents, whatever colour their skin is."
as "scrambled syntax that people adopt because they cannot bring themselves to use a singular pronoun".

New Hart's Rules (Oxford University Press, 2012) is aimed at those engaged in copy editing, and the emphasis is on the formal elements of presentation including punctuation and typeface, rather than on linguistic style, although – like The Chicago Manual of Style – it makes occasional forays into matters of usage. It advises against use of the purportedly gender-neutral he, and suggests cautious use of they where he or she presents problems.

The 2011 edition of the New International Version Bible uses singular they instead of the traditional he when translating pronouns that apply to both genders in the original Greek or Hebrew. This decision was based on research by a commission that studied modern English usage and determined that singular they (them/their) was by far the most common way that English-language speakers and writers today refer back to singular antecedents such as whoever, anyone, somebody, a person, no one, and the like."

The British edition of The Handbook of Nonsexist Writing, modified in some respects from the original US edition to conform to differences in culture and vocabulary, preserved the same recommendations, allowing singular they with semantically plural terms like "everyone" and indeterminate ones like "person", but recommending a rewrite to avoid.

Australian usage guidance
The Australian Federation Press Style Guide for Use in Preparation of Book Manuscripts recommends "gender-neutral language should be used", stating that use of they and their as singular pronouns is acceptable.

Usage guidance in English grammars

According to A Comprehensive Grammar of the English Language (1985):

The Cambridge Grammar of the English Language discusses the prescriptivist argument that they is a plural pronoun and that the use of they with a singular "antecedent" therefore violates the rule of agreement between antecedent and pronoun, but takes the view that they, though primarily plural, can also be singular in a secondary extended sense, comparable to the purportedly extended sense of he to include female gender.

Use of singular they is stated to be "particularly common", even "stylistically neutral" with antecedents such as everyone, someone, and no one, but more restricted when referring to common nouns as antecedents, as in
"The patient should be told at the outset how much they will be required to pay."
"A friend of mine has asked me to go over and help them ..."

Use of the pronoun themself is described as being "rare" and "acceptable only to a minority of speakers", while use of the morphologically plural themselves is considered problematic when referring to someone rather than everyone (since only the latter implies a plural set).

There are also issues of grammatical acceptability when reflexive pronouns refer to singular noun phrases joined by or, the following all being problematic:
"Either the husband or the wife has perjured himself." [ungrammatical]
"Either the husband or the wife has perjured themselves." [of questionable grammaticality]
"Either the husband or the wife has perjured themself." [typically used by only some speakers of Standard English].

On the motivation for using singular they, A Student's Introduction to English Grammar states:

The alternative he or she can be "far too cumbersome", as in:
"Everyone agreed that he or she would bring his or her lunch with him or her.
or even "flatly ungrammatical", as in
"Everyone's here, isn't he or she?

"Among younger speakers", use of singular they even with definite noun-phrase antecedents finds increasing acceptance, "sidestepping any presumption about the sex of the person referred to", as in:

"You should ask your partner what they think."
"The person I was with said they hated the film." Example given by Huddleston et al.

Grammatical and logical analysis

Notional agreement
Notional agreement is the idea that some uses of they might refer to a grammatically singular antecedent seen as semantically plural:
Tis meet that some more audience than a mother, since nature makes them partial, should o'erhear the speech." —Shakespeare, Hamlet (1599); quoted in Merriam-Webster's Concise Dictionary of English Usage.
"No man goes to battle to be killed." ... "But they do get killed." —George Bernard Shaw, quoted in Merriam-Webster's Concise Dictionary of English Usage

According to notional agreement, in the Shakespeare quotation a mother is syntactically singular, but stands for all mothers; and in the Shaw quotation no man is syntactically singular (taking the singular form goes), but is semantically plural (all go [to kill] not to be killed), hence idiomatically requiring they. Such use, which goes back a long way, includes examples where the sex is known, as in the above examples.

Distribution
Distributive constructions apply a single idea to multiple members of a group.
They are typically marked in English by words like each, every and any. The simplest examples are applied to groups of two, and use words like either and or – "Would you like tea or coffee?". Since distributive constructions apply an idea relevant to each individual in the group, rather than to the group as a whole, they are most often conceived of as singular, and a singular pronoun is used:

"England expects that every man will do his duty." — Nelson (1805, referring to a fleet crewed by male sailors)
"Every dog hath his day." — John Ray, A Collection of English Proverbs (1670), originally from Plutarch, Moralia, c. 95 AD, regarding the death of Euripides.

However, many languages, including English, show ambivalence in this regard. Because distribution also requires a group with more than one member, plural forms are sometimes used.

Referential and non-referential anaphors
The singular they, which uses the same verb form that plurals do, is typically used to refer to an indeterminate antecedent, for example:

"The person you mentioned, are they coming?"

In some sentences, typically those including words like every or any, the morphologically singular antecedent does not refer to a single entity but is "anaphorically linked" to the associated pronoun to indicate a set of pairwise relationships, as in the sentence:

"Everyone returned to their seats." (where each person is associated with one seat)

Linguists like Steven Pinker and Rodney Huddleston explain sentences like this (and others) in terms of bound variables, a term borrowed from logic. Pinker prefers the terms quantifier and bound variable to antecedent and  pronoun. He suggests that pronouns used as "variables" in this way are more appropriately regarded as homonyms of the equivalent referential pronouns.

The following shows different types of anaphoric reference, using various pronouns, including they:
 Coreferential, with a definite antecedent (the antecedent and the anaphoric pronoun both refer to the same real-world entity):
"Your wife phoned but she didn't leave a message."
 Coreferential with an indefinite antecedent:
"One of your girlfriends phoned, but she didn't leave a message."
"One of your boyfriends phoned, but he didn't leave a message."
"One of your friends phoned, but they didn't leave a message."
 Reference to a hypothetical, indefinite entity
"If you had an unemployed daughter, what would you think if she wanted to accept work as a mercenary?"
"If you had an unemployed child, what would you think if they wanted to accept work as a mercenary?"
 A bound variable pronoun is anaphorically linked to a quantifier (no single real-world or hypothetical entity is referenced; examples and explanations from Huddleston and Pullum, The Cambridge Grammar of the English Language):
"No one put their hand up." [approximately: "There is no person x such that x put xs hand up."]
"Every car had its windscreen broken." [approximately: "For every car x, x had xs windscreen broken."]

Cognitive efficiency
A study of whether "singular they" is more "difficult" to understand than gendered pronouns found that "singular they is a cognitively efficient substitute for generic he or she, particularly when the antecedent is nonreferential" (e.g. anybody, a nurse, or a truck driver) rather than referring to a specific person (e.g. a runner I knew or my nurse). Clauses with singular they were read "just as quickly as clauses containing a gendered pronoun that matched the stereotype of the antecedent" (e.g. she for a nurse and he for a truck driver) and "much more quickly than clauses containing a gendered pronoun that went against the gender stereotype of the antecedent".

On the other hand, when the pronoun they was used to refer to known individuals ("referential antecedents, for which the gender was presumably known", e.g. my nurse, that truck driver, a runner I knew), reading was slowed when compared with use of a gendered pronoun consistent with the "stereotypic gender" (e.g. he for a specific truck driver).

The study concluded that "the increased use of singular they is not problematic for the majority of readers".

Comparison with other pronouns
The singular and plural use of they can be compared with the pronoun you, which had been both a plural and polite singular, but by about 1700 replaced thou for singular referents. For "you", the singular reflexive pronoun ("yourself") is different from its plural reflexive pronoun ("yourselves"); with "they" one can hear either "themself" or "themselves" for the singular reflexive pronoun.

Singular "they" has also been compared to nosism (such as the "royal we"), when a single person uses first-person plural in place of first-person singular pronouns. Similar to singular "you", its singular reflexive pronoun ("ourself") is different from the plural reflexive pronoun ("ourselves").

While the pronoun set derived from it is primarily used for inanimate objects, it is frequently used in an impersonal context when someone's identity is unknown or established on a provisional basis, e.g. "Who is it?" or "With this new haircut, no one knows it is me." It is also used for infants of unspecified gender but may be considered dehumanizing and is therefore more likely in a clinical context. Otherwise, in more personal contexts, the use of it to refer to a person might indicate antipathy or other negative emotions.

It can also be used for non-human animals of unspecified sex, though they is common for pets and other domesticated animals of unspecified sex, especially when referred to by a proper name (e.g. Rags, Snuggles). Normally, birds and mammals with a known sex are referred to by their respective male or female pronoun (he and she; him and her).

It is uncommon to use singular they instead of it for something other than a life form.

See also
 English personal pronouns
 Gender neutrality in English
 Notional agreement
 Spivak pronoun
 Third-person pronoun#Historical, regional, and proposed gender-neutral singular pronouns
 Neopronoun
 Gender neutrality in languages with gendered third-person pronouns

Notes

 References 

 Sources Sources of original examples'''

 
 
 
 
 
 
 
 
 
 
 
 
 
 
 
 
 
 
 
 
 
 ; quoted in Reader's Digest, 1983, as an example of its awkwardness when referring to both sexes.
 
 

 
 
 
 
 

Bibliography

 
 
 
 
  As quoted by Miller and Swift.

 
 
 
 
 
 
 
 
 
 
 
 
 . N.B.: This is not the English usage authority Henry Watson Fowler.
 
 
 
 
 
 
 
 
 
 
 
 
 
 
 
 
 
 
 
 
 

 
 
 
 
 
 
 
 
 
 
 
 
 
 
 
 
 
 
 
 
 
 
 
 

Further reading
 Amia Srinivasan, "He, She, One, They, Ho, Hus, Hum, Ita" (review of Dennis Baron, What's Your Pronoun? Beyond He and She, Liveright, 2020, 304 pp.), London Review of Books'', vol. 42, no. 13 (2 July 2020), pp. 34–39. Prof. Srinivasan writes (p. 39): "People use non-standard pronouns, or use pronouns in non-standard ways, for various reasons: to accord with their sense of themselves, to make their passage through the world less painful, to prefigure and hasten the arrival of a world in which divisions of sex no longer matter. So too we can choose to respect people's pronouns for many reasons."

External links

 "Anyone who had a heart (would know their own language)" by Geoff Pullum. Transcript of a radio talk.
 A brief history of singular ‘they’ (OED blog, Dennis Baron)

English usage controversies
Grammatical number
Modern English personal pronouns